Bashirabad may refer to:

India
 Basheerabad, Andhra Pradesh

Iran
 Bashirabad, Bushehr
 Bashirabad, Fars
 Bashirabad, Hamadan
 Bashirabad, Kermanshah
 Bashirabad-e Bati, Kermanshah Province
 Bashirabad, Razavi Khorasan
 Bashirabad, Sistan and Baluchestan